Stephanie Stiegler (born January 2, 1980 in Manhattan Beach, California) is an American former pair skater. With partner John Zimmerman, she is the 1997 U.S. bronze medalist. With partner Lance Travis, she is the 1995 U.S. bronze medalist. She is the older sister of Tiffany Stiegler and Johnnie Stiegler.

Competitive highlights
GP = Champions Series (later Grand Prix)

With John Zimmerman

With Lance Travis

References

American female pair skaters
1980 births
Living people
Competitors at the 1994 Goodwill Games
21st-century American women
20th-century American women